Castellano & Pipolo is the stage name used by the pair of Italian screenwriters and film directors Franco Castellano (1925–1999) and Giuseppe Moccia (1933–2006). Together, they wrote the screenplays for about seventy films, and directed twenty films, mainly comedies. Their 1984 film Il ragazzo di campagna was shown as part of a retrospective on Italian comedy at the 67th Venice International Film Festival.

Selected filmography
 My Wife's Enemy (1959)
 Tipi da spiaggia (1959)
 Guardatele ma non toccatele (1959)
 Signori si nasce (1960)
 Toto, Fabrizi and the Young People Today (1960)
 The Fascist (1961)
 5 marines per 100 ragazze (1962)
 Obiettivo ragazze (1963)
 The Thursday (1963)
 I due pericoli pubblici (1964)
 Slalom (1965)
 The Man, the Woman and the Money (1965)
 I nuovi mostri (1977)
 Mia moglie è una strega (1980)
 Il ragazzo di campagna (1984)

References

External links

Italian screenwriters
Italian film directors
Italian television writers
Italian television directors
Italian male screenwriters
Male television writers
Films directed by Castellano & Pipolo